The Copa Fraternidad 1979 was played in two groups of six teams, the winners of each group decided the title in a double headed.  It was the ninth edition of this tournament under this name.

Teams

Group I

Results

Standings

1st Place playoff

 Abandoned at 1–1 during second half of extra time; awarded 2–0 Aurora.

Group II

Results

Standings

Final

Champion

References

1979
1
1978–79 in Honduran football
1978–79 in Salvadoran football
1978–79 in Guatemalan football